Susan Gibson was born in Fridley, Minnesota, and is a Wimberley, Texas-based singer and songwriter who has released six solo albums and tours the nation.  Gibson was the lead singer for the alternative country band, The Groobees, and is the writer of the Dixie Chicks hit "Wide Open Spaces".

Discography

References

External links
 Susan Gibson, singer-songwriter (Official web site)

American women country singers
American country singer-songwriters
Living people
Singer-songwriters from Texas
People from Fridley, Minnesota
People from Hays County, Texas
Year of birth missing (living people)
Country musicians from Texas
21st-century American women
Singer-songwriters from Minnesota